Taira Station (多比良駅, Taira-eki) is a train station located in Kunimi-chō, Unzen, Nagasaki. The station is serviced by Shimabara Railway and is a part of the Shimabara Railway Line.

Lines 
The train station is serving for the Shimabara Railway Line, with the local and express trains stop at the station.

Platforms 
The station consists of two side platform with two tracks.

History 
The station, formerly known as Tairamachi Station, was renamed to what it is now on 1 October 2019.

Adjacent stations

See also 
 List of railway stations in Japan

References

External links 
 

Railway stations in Japan opened in 1913
Railway stations in Nagasaki Prefecture
Stations of Shimabara Railway